Bruchophagus is a genus of wasps belonging to the family Eurytomidae.

The genus has cosmopolitan distribution.

Species

Species:

Bruchophagus abnormis 
Bruchophagus abscedus 
Bruchophagus acaciae

References

Eurytomidae